Encyrtinae is a subfamily of parasitic wasps in the family Encyrtidae.

Genera 
- Acerophagus - Achalcerinys - Adelencyrtoides - Adelencyrtus - Adencyrtus - Admirencyrtus - Aenasiella - Aenasomyiella - Aesaria - Aethognathus - Agarwalencyrtus - Agekianella - Ageniaspis - Agromyzaphagus - Allencyrtus - Allocerchysius - Aloencyrtus - Amauroencyrtus - Ameromyzobia - Amicencyrtus - Amicroterys - Amira - Ammonoencyrtus - Anagyrodes - Anasemion - Andinoencyrtus - Anicetus - Anisophleps - Anthemus - Aphidencyrtoides - Aphycinus - Aphycoides - Aphycomastix - Aphycomorpha - Aphycopsis - Aphyculus - Aphycus - Apsilophrys - Archinus - Argutencyrtus - Arhopoidiella - Arketypon - Arrhenophagoidea - Arrhenophagus - Arzonella - Aschitus - Aseirba - Asterolecanobius - Astymachus - Atelaphycus - Atropates - Australanusia - Australaphycus - Austrochoreia - Austroencyrtoidea - Austroencyrtus - Austromira - Avetianella - Aztecencyrtus - Baeoanusia - Baeocharis - Baeoencyrtus - Beethovena - Bennettisca - Blanchardiscus - Blastothrix - Blatticidella - Bolangera - Borrowella - Bothriocraera - Bothriophryne - Bothriothorax - Boucekiella - Brachyencyrtus - Brachyplatycerus - Brethesiella - Caenohomalopoda - Caldencyrtus - Carabunia - Casus - Ceballosia - Centencyrtus - Cerapteroceroides - Cerapterocerus - Ceraptroceroideus - Cerchysiella - Cerchysius - Cercobelus - Charitopsis - Cheiloneurella - Cheiloneuromyia - Cheiloneurus - Cheilopsis - Choreia - Chorotega - Chrysomelechthrus - Cibdeloencyrtus - Cicoencyrtus - Cirrhencyrtus - Clivia - Coagerus - Coccidaphycus - Coccidencyrtus - Coccidoctonus - Coccopilatus - Coelopencyrtus - Comones - Comperia - Comperiella - Conchynilla - Copidosoma - Copidosomopsis - Copidosomyia - Cowperia - Cranencyrtus - Cyderius - Deilio - Deloencyrtus - Diaphorencyrtus - Diasula - Dionencyrtus - Discodes - Diversinervus - Doddanusia - Ebito - Echthrobaccella - Echthroplexiella - Echthroplexis - Ectroma - Encyrtoalces - Encyrtoidea - Encyrtus - Eocencyrtus - Epiblatticida - Epicerchysius - Epiencyrtus - Epistenoterys - Epitetracnemus - Epitetralophidea - Eremencyrtus - Erencyrtus - Ethoris - Eucoccidophagus - Eugahania - Euogus - Euscapularia - Eusemion - Exoristobia - Forcipestricis - Formicencyrtus - Fulgoridicida - Gahaniella - Gentakola - Ginsiana - Globulencyrtus - Gonzalezia - Grissellia - Gwala - Habrolepis - Habrolepoidea - Habrolepopteryx - Hadrencyrtus - Hadzhibeylia - Haligra - Helegonatopus - Helygia - Hemencyrtus - Hemileucoceras - Hengata - Hesperencyrtus - Heterococcidoxenus - Hexacladia - Hexacnemus - Hexencyrtus - Homalopoda - Homalotyloidea - Homalotylus - Homosemion - Hoplopsis - Iceromyia - Ilicia - Inbiaphycus - Indaphycus - Ioessa - Islawes - Isodromoides - Isodromus - Ixodiphagus - Kataka - Koenigsmannia - Kurdjumovia - Laccacida - Lakshaphagus - Lamennaisia - Leefmansia - Leiocyrtus - Leurocerus - Lirencyrtus - Lochitoencyrtus - Lohiella - Lombitsikala - Mahencyrtus - Manmohanencyrtus - Mariola - Mashhoodiella - Mayrencyrtus - Mayridia - Melys - Meniscocephalus - Merlen - Meromyzobia - Mesanusia - Mesastymachus - Mesocalocerinus - Mesorhopella - Metablastothrix - Metanotalia - Metaphycus - Metapsyllaephagus - Microterys - Moorella - Mozartella - Mucrencyrtus - Muluencyrtus - Nassauia - Nathismusia - Neabrolepoideus - Neapsilophrys - Neastymachus - Neblatticida - Neocladella - Neocladia - Neococcidencyrtus - Neocyrtus - Neperpolia - Nerissa - Neruandella - Nezarhopalus - Oesol - Olypusa - Oobius - Ooencyrtus - Oophagus - Orianos - Oriencyrtus - Ovaloencyrtus - Ovidoencyrtus - Paksimmondsius - Papaka - Papuna - Parablastothrix - Parablatticida - Parachalcerinys - Paracladella - Paraenasomyia - Paramucrona - Paraphaenodiscus - Paraphycus - Parasauleia - Parastenoterys - Paratetracnemoidea - Paratetralophidea - Parechthrodryinus - Parectromoides - Parencyrtomyia - Parencyrtus - Pareupelmus - Pareusemion - Pasulinia - Pawenus - Pentacladocerus - Pentelicus - Perpolia - Phauloencyrtus - Philosindia - Pistulina - Plagiomerus - Platencyrtus - Prionomastix - Prionomitoides - Prionomitus - Prochiloneurus - Profundiscrobis - Proleuroceroides - Proleurocerus - Protaenasius - Protyndarichoides - Pseudectroma - Pseudencyrtoides - Pseudencyrtus - Pseudhomalopoda - Pseudococcobius - Pseudorhopus - Psilophryoidea - Psilophrys - Psyllaephagus - Psyllaphycus - Psyllechthrus - Pulexencyrtus - Quadrencyrtus - Raffaellia - Rhopalencyrtoidea - Rhytidothorax - Ruandella - Ruskiniana - Saera - Sanghalia - Saprencyrtus - Sarisencyrtus - Satureia - Saucrencyrtus - Sauleia - Scotteus - Sectiliclava - Semen - Sharqencyrtus - Shenahetia - Simmondsiella - Solenaphycus - Solenoencyrtus - Spaniopterus - Stemmatosteres - Stenoteropsis - Subprionomitus - Syrphophagus - Szelenyiola - Tachardiaephagus - Tachardiobius - Tachinaephagus - Tanyencyrtus - Teleterebratus - Tetarticlava - Tetracyclos - Thomsonisca - Tineophoctonus - Tobiasia - Tonkinencyrtus - Trechnites - Tremblaya - Trichomasthus - Trigonogaster - Trjapitzinellus - Tyndarichus - Tyndaricopsis - Vietmachus - Viggianiola - Vivamexico - Whittieria - Xenoencyrtus - Xenostryxis - Xerencyrtus - Xylencyrtus - Zaomma - Zaommoencyrtus - Zarhopaloides - Zelaphycus - Zelencyrtus - Zooencyrtus - Zozoros

References 

 Guerrieri, E. ; M.E. Huigens ; C. Estrada ; J.B. Woelke ; M. de Rijk ; N.E. Fatouros ; A. Aiello & J.S. Noyes 2010: Ooencyrtus marcelloi sp. nov. (Hymenoptera: Encyrtidae), an egg parasitoid of Heliconiini (Lepidoptera: Nymphalidae: Heliconiinae) on passion vines (Malpighiales: Passifloraceae) in Central America. Journal of Natural History 44 (1 & 2): 81-87, 
 Gu, Z.-H., 2003: A new genus and two new species of Encyrtidae from China (Hymenoptera: Chalcidoidea). Russian Entomological Journal 12 (3): 307-310
 Koçak, A.Ö.; Kemal, M. 2008: Nomenclatural notes on the genus group names in the order Hymenoptera (Chalcidoidea). Centre for Entomological Studies Ankara miscellaneous papers, 143: 3-7
 Li, C.D. & F.L. Ma, 2007: A New Species of Copidosoma Ratzeburg (Hymenoptera: Encyrtidae) from China. Entomotaxonomia 29 (1): 63-65
 Myartseva, S.N. & E. Ruiz-Cancino. 2010: A new species of Metaphycus Mercet (Hymenoptera: Encyrtidae) from Mexico and key to the species of the genera parasitizing whiteflies ((Hemiptera: Aleyrodidae) in the Neotropical region. Acta Zoológica Mexicana (n.s.) 26 (1): 17-24
 Simutnik, S.A., 2010: A new species of the genus Encyrtus (Hymenoptera, Encyrtidae) from Israel. Entomological Review 90 (4): 537-539, 
 Trjapitzin, V.A. 2004: Neruandella gen. n. from Mexico and USA (Hymenoptera: Encyrtidae). Zoosystematica Rossica, 13: 124
 Trjapitzin, V.A. 2008: [A review of encyrtid wasps (Hymenoptera, Chalcidoidea, Encyrtidae) of Macaronesia]. Entomologicheskoe Obozrenie, 87(1): 166–184. [in Russian, English translation in Entomological review, 88(2): 218-232, 
 Trjapitzin, V.A. 2008: Redescription of Charitopus cuprifrons (Motschulsky, 1863) from Sri Lanka, and a new name for the genus Sancarlosia Trjapitzin et Myartseva, 2004 from Mexico (Hymenoptera: Encyrtidae). Russian entomological journal, 17: 213–216
 Trjapitzin, V.A.; Myartseva, S.N. 2004: Sancarlosia tamaulipeca gen. et sp. n. (Hymenoptera: Encyrtidae) reared in Mexico from Differococcus argentinus (Morrison) (Homoptera: Coccidae) on the American spiny hackberry Celtis pallida Torr. Zoosystematica Rossica, 12: 259-261
 Zhang, Y.-Z. & D.-W. Huang, 2007: A review of Parablatticida Girault (Hymenoptera: Encyrtidae) from China, with description of two new species. Acta Entomologica Sinica 50(2): 165-171

External links 
 

 
Hymenoptera subfamilies